Lukulu District is a district of Zambia, located in Western Province. The capital lies at Lukulu. As of the 2000 Zambian Census, the district had a population of 68,375 people.

References

Districts of Western Province, Zambia